Maurice Gillen (25 July 1895 – 6 April 1974) was a Luxembourgian cyclist. He competed in the sprint event at the 1924 Summer Olympics. Outside of cycling he worked as a train driver. He was the father of cyclist Lucien Gillen. He also worked as a soigneur for rider Jean Majerus.

References

External links
 

1895 births
1974 deaths
Luxembourgian male cyclists
Olympic cyclists of Luxembourg
Cyclists at the 1924 Summer Olympics
Cyclists from Paris
French male cyclists